The 1813 New Hampshire gubernatorial election was held on March 9, 1813.

Incumbent Democratic-Republican Governor William Plumer was defeated by Federalist nominee John Taylor Gilman.

General election

Candidates
John Taylor Gilman, Federalist, former Governor
William Plumer, Democratic-Republican, incumbent Governor

Results

Notes

References

1813
New Hampshire
Gubernatorial